The Very Best of dansbandshårdrock is a 2000 compilation album from Swedish heavy metal band Black Ingvars.

Track listing
Inget stoppar oss nu
Whole Lotta Engberg
Mitt eget blue Hawaii
Leende guldbruna ögon
Eloise
Karlstads collage
Två mörka ögon
Tio tusen röda rosor
Mjölnarens Irene
Gråt inga tårar
Flamingo medley
Du gav bara löften
Sofia dansar go-go
Natten har tusen ögon
Dra dit pepparn växer
Tusen bitar
Ljus och värme
De sista ljuva åren
Vem tänder stjärnorna
Vindens melodi

References 

Black Ingvars albums
2000 greatest hits albums